The 2021 League1 Ontario season was the sixth season of play (the 2020 season was cancelled due to the COVID-19 pandemic) for the Women's Division of League1 Ontario, a Division 3 women's soccer league in the Canadian soccer pyramid and the highest level of soccer based in the Canadian province of Ontario.

The league announced a projected start date of July 2, 2021, also announcing a 'drop-dead date' of June 7, 2021 that will confirm the start of the season on that date depending on restrictions in the province, otherwise the season would be cancelled.

Format 
The league will be played in a single table of 7 teams, playing a total of 12 matches, with the top four clubs advancing to the playoffs.

Because the season began three months later than normal and with very short notice, some clubs have opted to delay their return to Premier Division competition until the 2022 season.  As a large portion of the L1O player pool consisted of university and college student athletes, some sides would have limited squads after Labour Day. To combat these challenges, the league created a short-season ‘Summer Championship Series’ for 2021, which will conclude by Labour Day.

In addition, the Reserve Division will begin for the first time (after the inaugural women's reserve division was cancelled along with the rest of the league in 2020, following a similar format to the Premier Division, featuring 10 teams playing 12 matches, with the top teams advancing to the playoffs and featuring Championship Finals weekend on November 6-7.

Clubs
The women's division consists of 15 teams, an increase from 13 teams in 2020. Guelph Union, Tecumseh SC, and Waterloo United are new addition, while Aurora FC did not return. North Toronto Nitros will also be making their official debut, after their inaugural season was cancelled due to the pandemic.

The following clubs are set to participate in the league:

The following clubs, while not formally part of the League1 Ontario women's division are operating teams in the Reserve Division (both clubs operate teams in the men's division):

Main Division

Playoffs

Semi-finals

Final

Statistics

Top goalscorers 

Source:

Top goalkeepers 

 Minimum 270 minutes played.  Source:

Honours
The following awards and nominations were awarded for the 2021 season.

Awards

League All-Stars

First Team

Second Team

Summer Championship Division
The league is operating a short-season division called the Summer Championship in 2021.

Reserve Division
The league is set to operate a Reserve division this season as well.

Playoffs

Semi-finals

Final

References

External links 

League1 Ontario Women
League1 Ontario (women) seasons